Phyllonorycter tristrigella is a moth of the family Gracillariidae. It is known from all of Europe, except the Iberian Peninsula and the Balkan Peninsula, east to the European part of Russia. It was also recorded from Japan, but this is a misidentification of Phyllonorycter laciniatae.

The wingspan is 7–9 mm. There are two generations per year with adults on wing in May and again in August.

The larvae feed on Ulmus glabra, Ulmus x hollandica, Ulmus laevis and Ulmus minor, mining the leaves. They create a long, lower-surface tubular tentiform mine between two lateral veins which often run from the midrib to the leaf margin. The lower epidermis has several long folds which are positioned close together. The pupa is light brown and made in an olive-green or brown cocoon which is attached to the lower epidermis. All of the frass is deposited in a mass in one corner of the mine.

References

External links

tristrigella
Moths described in 1828
Moths of Europe
Taxa named by Adrian Hardy Haworth